To Catch a Killer is a two-part television film from 1992, directed by Eric Till and starring Brian Dennehy and Michael Riley. It is based on the true story of the pursuit of American serial killer John Wayne Gacy.

Plot 
As he investigates the missing person report of a teenager named Christopher Gant (based on Gacy's final victim, Robert Piest), Des Plaines, IL detective Lt. Joseph R. Kozenczak (Riley) becomes concerned that local businessman John Wayne Gacy (Dennehy) may be responsible for this as well as many other disappearances. However, when he and his team are ready to arrest Gacy, their evidence is viewed as being circumstantial. Worst of all, everyone (including Kozenczak's superiors) view Gacy as a respectable pillar of society. Meanwhile, Gacy himself begins a sadistic game of cat-and-mouse as he tries in every way to manipulate and outwit the police.

After eventually achieving two search warrants, Kozenczak finds a large amount of incriminating evidence, and later 29 bodies buried throughout John Gacy's property; the remaining four are found dumped in a nearby river, including Gant's remains. Afterwards, he is charged with the rape and murder of 33 boys and young men and convicted, being sentenced to death.

Cast 

 Brian Dennehy as John Wayne Gacy
 Michael Riley as Lieutenant Joseph 'Joe / Polack' Kozenczak
 Margot Kidder as Rachel Grayson
 Meg Foster as City Attorney Linda Carlson
 Martin Julien as Theodore 'Ted' Koslo
 Scott Hylands as Delta Squad Sergeant Mike Paxton
 David Eisner as Detective Terry Williams
 John Boylan as Detective Gary Atkins
 Tony De Santis as Delta Squad Detective Craig DeMarco
 Mark Humphrey as Delta Squad Detective King
 Gary Reineke as Delta Squad Detective Leonard 'Lenny' Petrie
 Tim Progosh as Delta Squad Detective Jack Morris
 Danny Pawlick as Patrolman Tony Santori
 Bruce Ramsay as Forensic Officer Edward 'Ed' Bragg
 Brenda Bazinet as Alice Pearson
 Liliane Clune as Marcia Kozenczak
 Toby Proctor as Michael Kozenczak
 Christopher Marren as Billy
 Jay Brazeau as Jake Burns

Impact/reception 

The film was broadcast in three countries, the United States, Canada and the United Kingdom. In general, the film was received well by critics. As a result, Brian Dennehy was nominated for an Emmy Award for "Outstanding Lead Actor in a Miniseries or a Special." In addition, actor Michael Riley and director Eric Till were both nominated for two individual Gemini Awards.

Historical context 

The film broadly follows the historical narrative of the investigation which lead to John Wayne Gacy's arrest in December 1978 and it does not directly depict his earlier life or his criminal activity prior to 1978. Several changes were made to the names and details of the real persons who were involved in the case. These changes were possibly made for legal reasons, because many key witnesses and victims' family members, as well as Gacy himself, were still alive at the time of the film's production. In the film Gacy's last known victim Robert Piest was represented as 'Chris Gant.' In the film the name of Gacy's contracting company was changed from 'PDM Contractors' to 'LPW Construction.' The real-life detective Lt. Joseph R. Kozenczak served as a technical advisor during the film's production.

Dennehy's performance was widely recognized and the actor became associated with Gacy. In 2010, eighteen years after the film's first broadcast in the US and sixteen years after John Wayne Gacy's execution, a profile of Dennehy in Times of North West Indiana noted, "whenever Dennehy comes back to Chicago, which is often... he's inevitably asked about his made-for-television 1992 movie role in To Catch a Killer." Dennehy received a letter from Gacy following the film's US broadcast, in which Gacy admonished him for taking part in a "fraud" film, and maintained his claim that "lots of people had access to that crawl space."

References

External links 
 

1992 television films
1992 films
American television films
Films about John Wayne Gacy
Crime films based on actual events
Films directed by Eric Till
Biographical films about serial killers